Junges Theater Bonn  is a theatre in Bonn, North Rhine-Westphalia, Germany.

Theatres in Bonn
Buildings and structures in Bonn